Mirza Mahdi Elahi Qomshehei (January 1, 1901 – May 15, 1973) was an Iranian mystic, poet, translator of the Quran, and one of the grand Masters of the philosophical school of Tehran.

Family
His family were originally from Bahrain. Most of them were sophisticated men of knowledge. They resided in Ghomshe or Sah-Reza near the south Isfahan City. He was born in 1319 lunar Islamic year in Isfahan.  He was known as the reviver of religion (Mohyy Al Din). He selected the title of Elahi in his poems.

Education
He was under supervision of Grand masters from different cities such as Esfahan, Najaf, Mashhad and Tehran.

Teachers
He had many teachers, including:
Molla Muhammad Mahdi Farzaneh Qomshehei, Hasan Amin Jafari. Sheykh Muhammad hakim Khorasani, Sayyed Hasan Modarres, Aqa Bozorge hakim, The Grand Ayatollah Hajj Aqa Hosein Qommi, Sheykh Asadollah Yazdi, Fazil, Fazin Barsi, Hajj Mirza Hasan faqih Sabzevari Khorasani, Mirza Mahdi Esfahani, Mirza Tahir Tonekaboni.

Career
He taught in Sepahsalar School, University of Tehran for 35 years.

Translation
The late Mirza Mahdi translated for the first time the Quran into Persian such that  this translation was up to date along with the summary of other commentaries. The translation was also honored by the grand Ayatollah Bojnourdi.

Pupils
Some of his pupils:
Allameh Hasanzadeh, Allameh Abdollah Javadi-Amoli, Ayatollah Hajj Sayyed Muhammad Hasan Langroudi, Ayatollah Sayyed Razi Shirazi, Kazim Midir Shanehchi, DR sayyed Muhammad Baqir Hojjati, Muhammad Baqir Muhaqiq, Sheykh Abdul Rahim Malakian.

Works

He wrote many books and notes in diverse religious sciences. Some of them are as follow:
 Translation of Quran
 Selected of Commentaries
 Notes on Abul Fotuh Al Razi's  commentary in 10 volumes.
 Translation and explanation of Sahifah Sajjadiyyah
 Divine wisdom
 The explanation of fosus Al Hikmah of Al-Farabi
 The philosophy of Al-Farabi
 The Divine unity of Sages (Doctoral Dissertation)
 Mystical courses of Alavid' s school
 Treatise in universal philosophy
 Treatise in degrees of love

Death
He died in twelfth of second Rabi 1356 solar. He was buried near the shrine of  Masoumah in Qom in Vadi Al Salam.

References

External links

1901 births
1973 deaths
Academic staff of the University of Tehran
20th-century Iranian poets
Quran translators
20th-century translators
Iranian Muslim mystics